Poweshiek Township is a township in Jasper County, Iowa, USA.

History
Poweshiek Township was established in 1847. It is named for Chief Poweshiek of the Meskwaki Indians.

References

Townships in Jasper County, Iowa
Townships in Iowa
1847 establishments in Iowa